This list of University of Sheffield people is a selected list of notable past staff and students of the University of Sheffield.

Notable alumni

Academics
 Syed I. Ahson,  computer science professor, education management professional, researcher, and author
 Percy Anstey, Principal of Sydenham College of Commerce and Economics in Mumbai (1914-1920)
 Freda Briggs, Emeritus Professor, University of South Australia, child protection expert
 Thom Brooks, Dean, Durham Law School & Professor of Law and Government Durham University (PhD Philosophy 2004)
 Alasdair Cochrane, Professor of Political Theory, University of Sheffield (BA Politics 2000)
 Sir Paul Curran, President, City, University of London (BSc Geography 1976)
 Roma Gill, Reader in English Literature (1963-1984)
 Paddy Nixon, Vice-Chancellor & President, Ulster University (PhD 1994)
 Stuart Palmer FREng, Deputy Vice-Chancellor, University of Warwick
 Michael Sterling, Vice-Chancellor, University of Birmingham (BEng Electronic and Electrical Engineering 1967, PhD 1971)
 George Martin Stephen, High Master, St Paul's School (PhD)
 John Sutton, Sir John Hicks Professor of Economics, London School of Economics
 Richard Wilding OBE, Professor of Supply Chain Strategy, Cranfield University and Chairman of the Chartered Institute of Logistics & Transport (BSc (Tech) Material Science 1987)

Business people
 Richard Cousins, CEO of Compass Group world's largest foodservice company
 Hussain Dawood, Chairman of Dawood Hercules Corporation Limited, Engro Corporation Limited
 John Devaney, chairman, Marconi PLC
 Jeremy Grantham, co-founder of GMO asset management
Param Singh, Property Developer, Entrepreneur
 Penny Hughes, former president of Coca-Cola Enterprises (UK) (BSc (Hons) Chemistry)
 Sir Peter Middleton, Camelot Barclays Chairman
 Edward H Ntalami, Chief Executive, Capital Markets Authority, Kenya
 Jim O'Neill, Head of global economic research, Goldman Sachs and coined the thesis of BRIC countries
 Richard Simmons, CEO Commission for Architecture and the Built Environment (CABE)
Wei Yang, Founder of Wei Yang & Partner, Town Planner and Urban Designer (MSc 2001, PhD 2005)

Lawyers
 David Childs, former Managing Partner of Clifford Chance
 Mohammad Qasim Hashimzai, Deputy Minister of Justice, Afghanistan
 Md. Muzammel Hossain, Chief Justice of Bangladesh
 Henry M. Joko-Smart, former Sierra Leonean Supreme Court Justice
 Sir Maurice Kay Lord Justice of Appeal
 Sir Paul Kennedy, Lord Justice of Appeal, Interception of Communications Commissioner
 Sir Nigel Knowles, CEO of the Anglo-American law firm DLA Piper
 Dame Julia Macur, Lord Justice of Appeal
 Sir Alistair MacDuff, High Court of Justice of England and Wales
 Dame Anne Rafferty, Lord Justice of Appeal
 Tommy Sihotang, Indonesian Lawyer
 Arifin Zakaria, Chief Justice of Malaysia

In November 2013, for the first time in history, the Court of Appeal had an all-Sheffield alumni bench. The judges sitting were Lord Justice Maurice Kay (LLB Law, 1964; PhD Law, 1971 and Hon LLD, 2003), Lady Justice Anne Rafferty (LLB Law, 1971 and Hon LLD, 2005) and Lady Justice Julia Macur (LLB Law, 1978).
This event was also extremely significant because outside Oxford and Cambridge, Sheffield now has the record for the highest number of graduates appointed to the bench above any other UK University.

Authors

 Lindsay Ashford, author
 Lee Child, novelist (LLB)
 Sophie Deen, children's book author
 Katie Edwards (author) (alumni and former faculty 2012–2020)
 Gregory Evans, dramatist
 Nicci Gerrard, author
 Joanne Harris, author (later became faculty)
 Brooke Magnanti, a.k.a. "Belle de Jour", author
 Hilary Mantel, author (LLB), two times Booker Prize winner
 Jack Rosenthal, playwright
 John Thompson (poet) (1938–1976), Canadian poet

Media and artists

 Van Badham, columnist for The Guardian, playwright
 Carol Barnes, ITN Newsreader
 Douglas Bostock, conductor
 Lucie Cave, journalist, editor of Heat magazine
Munya Chawawa, comedian
 Peter Cheeseman, theatre director, leading pioneer of theatre-in-the-round and documentary drama
 Chris Chibnall, television screenwriter and producer
 Stephen Daldry, stage and film director
 Martin Fry, lead singer of ABC
 Brian Glover, actor
 Ian Hallard, actor
 Eddie Izzard, comedian
 Tim Key, comedian, poet, recipient of the Edinburgh Comedy Award 2009
 Glenn Moore, comedian
 Sid Lowe, journalist and columnist for The Guardian 
 Paul Mason, journalist and former economics editor for the BBC's Newsnight
 John O'Leary, Times Higher Education Supplement editor
 Rachel Shelley, actress (BA (Hons) English and Drama)
 Linda Smith, comedian and head of the British Humanist Association
 Dan Walker, journalist and television presenter
 Andrew Wilson, Sky News presenter and former foreign correspondent
 Frank Worrall, The Sun, author and journalist
Selina Thompson, performance artist and playwright

Pioneers
 Amy Johnson, pilot (BA (Hons) Economics, 1926)
 Roy Koerner, Polar Explorer
 Helen Sharman, first British astronaut (BSc (Hons) Chemistry, 1984)
 Eric Moxey, bomb disposal expert and inventor of the Fuze Extractor

Politicians

 Jean-Paul Adam, Minister for Foreign Affairs (Seychelles)
 Peter Adams, Canadian politician
 Jonathan Arnott, UK Independence Party MEP
 Kevin Barron, Labour MP
 Gerry Bermingham, Labour MP
 Sir Jake Berry, Conservative MP
 Olivia Blake, Labour MP for Sheffield Hallam
 David Blunkett, MP for Sheffield Brightside and former Home Secretary
 Nurettin Canikli, Incumbent First Deputy Prime Minister of Turkey in Binali Yaldrim's Cabinet, former Minister for Customs and Trade, Turkey
 Sarah Champion Labour MP
 David Clark, Baron Clark of Windermere, Labour peer
 Serge Joyal, Canadian Senator
 Judith Kirton-Darling, Labour Member of the European Parliament
 Nicholas Liverpool, 6th President of Dominica
 Justin Madders, Labour MP
 Anne Main, Conservative MP for St Albans
 Brian Millard, leader of Stockport Metropolitan Borough Council from 2005 to 2007
 Shaffaq Mohammed, Liberal Democrat MEP
 Hugo Antonio Laviada Molina, Mexican politician
 Fenella Mukangara, Minister of Information, Culture and Sports, Tanzania
 Philip Norton, Baron Norton of Louth, Conservative peer & academic
 Steve Reed, Labour MP
 Onkar Sahota, Labour London Assembly Member for Ealing and Hillingdon
 Kadi Sesay, Minister of Trade and Industry, Sierre Leone
 Graham Stringer, Labour MP
 Yb Dato' Rashid bin Hasnon, Deputy Chief Minister of Penang, Malaysia PKR MLA
 Sir Chung Sze-yuen, former Convenor of the Executive Council of Hong Kong
 Montfort Tadier, Jersey Politician
 Ann Taylor, Baroness Taylor of Bolton, Labour MP for Bolton West and Dewsbury, subsequently a life peer and former minister at the Ministry of Defence
 Nick Timothy, Downing Street Chief of Staff
 Eric Graham Varley, former Labour Cabinet minister
 Caroline Voaden, Liberal Democrat MEP
 Sir Frederick Archibald Warner, diplomat & Member of the European Parliament

Public servants

 Khalid S. Al-Ageel, General Secretary of the High Commission for Industrial Security, Saudi Arabia
 Maggie Atkinson, Children's Commissioner for England
 Sir Michael Carlisle, Senior Civil Servant
 Lim Neo Chian, former Chief of Singapore Army
 Major-General Andrew Farquhar, British Army
 Sir Vincent Fean, British diplomat
 Andy Haldane, Chief Economist at the Bank of England
 Bernard Hogan-Howe, Baron Hogan-Howe, Commissioner, London's Metropolitan Police Service
 Sir Ken Jones, Deputy Commissioner of Victoria Police, Chief Constable, Sussex Police
 Vanessa Lawrence, Ordnance Survey Director-General
 Vice-Admiral Sir Charles Montgomery, Director General, UK Border Force
 Air Chief Marshal Stuart Peach, Baron Peach, Chief of the Defence Staff, UK
 Crispian Strachan, Chief Constable of Northumbria Police
 Phil Wheatley, Director-General HM Prison Service

Clergy
Wesley Carr, Dean of Westminster Abbey
John Chew, Bishop of Singapore
Glenn Davies, Archbishop of Sydney
Jan McFarlane, Bishop of Repton
Tony Nichols, Bishop of North West Australia
John Parkes, Bishop of Wangaratta
Martyn Percy, Dean of Christ Church, Oxford
Henry William Scriven, Bishop of Pittsburgh
Stephen Smyth, General Secretary of Action of Churches Together in Scotland (2007–2014)
Martyn Snow, Bishop of Leicester
Alan Winton, Bishop of Thetford

Scientists
 Sir Donald Bailey, civil engineer and inventor of the Bailey bridge
 Anna Batchelor, first woman Dean of the Faculty of Intensive Care Medicine and past president, Intensive Care Society (MBBS 1980)
 Sir Harold Kroto, Nobel Prize-winning chemist (BSc (Hons) Chemistry, 1961; PhD, 1961–1964)
 Sir Hans Kornberg, biochemist, Master of Christ's College Cambridge
 Sir Richard Roberts, Nobel Prize-winning geneticist (BSc (Hons) Chemistry, 1965; PhD, 1968)
 Olive Scott, paediatric cardiologist (MBBS 1948; MD 1957)

Sports people

 Nick Beighton, Paralympic Bronze Medallist 2016, Men's KL2 canoe sprint
 Herbert Chapman, footballer and manager
 Zara Dampney,  beach volleyball player
 David Davies, The Football Association Chief Executive
 Jessica Ennis, Olympic Gold Medalist, heptathlete
 Catherine Faux, triathlete
 Tony Miles, the United Kingdom's first chess grand master
 Bryony Page, Olympic Silver Medallist 2016, trampolining
 C R Roberts, athlete
 Tim Robinson, England International Cricketer
 Hollie Webb, Olympic Gold Medallist 2016, women's hockey
 David Wetherall, footballer
 David Wetherill, Paralympic table tennis player
 Kristian Jones and Jamie Stevenson, orienteers with medals at world championships
Lizzy Banks, professional cyclist

Notable academics
 Francis Berry, poet and literary critic
 Norman Blake, Middle English and Early Modern English language and literature scholar
 Peter Blundell Jones, Professor in Architecture
 Sir Anthony Bottoms, Professor of Criminology
 Angela Carter, author (1976–1978)
 Henry Coward, conductor
 Paul Dolan, Professor of Behavioural Science
 Danny Dorling, former professor of Geography
 Sir Bernard Crick, former Professor of Politics
 Sir Graeme Davies, Vice-Chancellor University of London
 Charles Eliot, diplomat, Vice-Chancellor
 Lilian Edwards, Professor of Internet Law
 Sir William Empson, poet (The School of English names its facilities after him)
 Pamela Enderby, Professor of Community Rehabilitation
 Dr Katie Edwards, author (2012–2020; was also a student)
 Howard Florey, Nobel Prize winner, Joseph Hunter Professor of Pathology
 Andrew Gamble, political economist, Professor of Politics
 Joanne Harris, author (2000; was also a student)
 Peter Hill, well-known pianist and expert on the works of Olivier Messiaen
 Sir Robert Honeycombe, metallurgist
 R. J. Hopper, Professor of Ancient History
 David Hughes, astronomer, Asteroid 4205 is named in his honour.
 Dame Betty Kershaw, Dean of the School of Nursing
 Sir Ian Kershaw, historian
 Sir Hans Adolf Krebs, Nobel Prize-winning biochemist (1935–1954)
 Stephen Laurence, philosopher and cognitive scientist
 Sir Colin Lucas, historian, chair of the board of the British Library
 Peter Maitlis FRS, Professor of Inorganic Chemistry
 David Marquand, politician
 Edward Mellanby, Professor of Pharmacology, discoverer of Vitamin D
 Brian Robert Morris, Professor of English
 Douglas Northcott FRS, Professor of Mathematics
 George Porter, Nobel Prize-winning chemist (1955–1966)
 Sir David Read, Emeritus Professor of Plant Science
 Colin Renfrew, archaeologist
 Sir Gareth Roberts, Vice-Chancellor
 Piers Robinson, professor of politics, society and political journalism
 William Sarjeant, geologist
 Joanna Shapland, Edward Bramley Professor of Criminal Justice
 Noel Sharkey, broadcaster, Professor of Artificial Intelligence and Robotics, Professor of Public Engagement
 Susan Sherratt, archaeologist of Bronze Age Greece, Cyprus, and the Eastern Mediterranean
 Michael Siva-Jothy, entomologist
 Sir Fraser Stoddart, chemist
 Stephen Stich, Honorary Professor of Philosophy
 Charles J. M. Stirling FRS, Professor of Chemistry
 Digby Tantam, British psychiatrist and Professor of Psychotherapy
 Simon Tavaré FRS FMedSci, computational biologist and statistician, founding director of the Irving Institute for Cancer Dynamics
 Grenville Turner FRS, Professor of Physics
 W E S Turner (1881–1963), Professor of Glass Technology and founder of the museum which bears his name
 Sir James Underwood, Joseph Hunter Professor of Pathology and Dean of the Faculty of Medicine
 Yorick Wilks, Professor of Artificial Intelligence
 Thomas D Wilson, Professor of Information Behaviour
 Peter Willett, Professor of Information Science
 Sir Michael Woodruff, transplant surgeon

References

 
Sheffield
Sheffield-related lists